The Hong Kong Jewish Film Festival (HKJFF) is an annual film festival dedicated to world cinema that focuses on Jewish life, history and culture worldwide. It was founded in 1999 by Howard Elias from Toronto, Canada, and takes place in Hong Kong.
 
The 15th Festival ran from 29 November to 7 December 2014. The 16th Festival ran from 14 to 22 November 2015. The 20th Festival ran from 2 to 10 November 2019. The 22nd Festival ran from 13 to 21 November 2021.

References

External links
 Official website

1999 establishments in Hong Kong
1999 film festivals
Annual events in Hong Kong
Film festivals in Hong Kong
Jewish film festivals
Film festivals established in 1999